Albert Oxley (21 October 1915 – 1994) was an English footballer who played as an inside forward.

Oxley played league football for Gateshead between 1934 and 1947, playing a total of 128 games and scoring 26 goals.

Career statistics

References
 
 

1915 births
1994 deaths
English footballers
Association football forwards
Gateshead F.C. players
English Football League players